Will Bond (born April 8, 1970) is an attorney and Democratic politician from Little Rock, Arkansas. Born in Jacksonville, Bond studied political science at Vanderbilt University before earning a Juris Doctor at the University of Arkansas School of Law in 1995. Working as an attorney in Central Arkansas, Bond represented the Jacksonville area in the Arkansas House of Representatives from 2003 to 2008. He was elected chair of the Democratic Party of Arkansas in 2011, serving until 2013. Bond served in the Arkansas Senate from 2016 to 2021. He lives in Little Rock with his wife Gabriel and their three children.

Background
Born April 8, 1970, in Jacksonville, Bond is the son of former State Representative Pat Bond and Tommy Bond. He has two sisters, Melissa Bond and Kelly Bond Emerson. Will Bond graduated from Jacksonville High School. He attended Vanderbilt University in Nashville, Tennessee, receiving a Bachelor of Arts in political science in 1992, and graduating from the University of Arkansas School of Law in Fayetteville in 1995.

He worked as an associate at Friday, Eldredge & Clark in Little Rock until 1996. Bond joined Pulaski County Clerk Pat O'Brien in creating the Bond & O'Brien law firm, which would change to Bond & Chamberlin when Neil Chamberlin joined the firm in 2002. Bond succeeded his mother, Pat, in representing the 44th District of the Arkansas House of Representatives from 2003 to 2008. Representative Bond's service in the House earned him recognition in Arkansas Business's "40 under 40" list in 2005.

Arkansas's state house and senate offices are part-time positions, and Bond continued legal work during his service in the Arkansas House. Bond joined McMath Woods, P.A., a plaintiff's firm specializing in injury law, as a partner in 2006. He is admitted to practice law in all state and federal courts in Arkansas, the Eighth Circuit Court of Appeals, and the Supreme Court of the United States.

Bond and his wife Gabriel live in Little Rock, Arkansas with their three children.

Democratic Party of Arkansas
On February 12, 2011, Bond was elected to serve as the chair of the Democratic Party of Arkansas. Bond remained in the position until resigning on July 31, 2013. It was speculated Bond was resigning to pursue elected office, including the Arkansas 2nd or Arkansas Attorney General, but he chose not to run. Bond was replaced at the DPA by Vincent Insalaco.

Political career

State House
During his time in the Arkansas House of Representatives (2003-2008), Bond held numerous positions including Chairman of the city, County and Local Affairs Committee and served on the Joint Budget Committee, including being Chair of the Special Language subcommittee. Arkansas Business awarded Bond with the Top 40 Under 40 Award for his legislative work on school consolidation, health savings accounts, efforts to reduce recidivism in the state's Department of Correction and identity theft prevention.

State Senate
On June 18, 2015, Bond announced he would run for the Arkansas State Senate. The 32nd District is a strong Democratic district, located in an affluent section of Little Rock including the Arkansas State Capitol, Colony West, Leawood, Cammack Village, Pleasant Valley, and parts of Chenal Valley. The incumbent, David Johnson, chose to run for Jacksonville/Maumelle District Judge. Initially believed to be a crowded Democratic field, Bond won the Democratic nomination unopposed. Bond defeated Jacob Mosier of the Libertarian Party, 75% to 25%, on November 8, 2016, to win the seat (the Republican Party did not field a candidate).

He was assigned to the city, County and Local Affairs and Judiciary committees. Bond was the primary sponsor of 21 bills in the 91st General Assembly, with four minor bills becoming law. He co-sponsored the Teacher's Classroom Investment Deduction, an up-to $250 tax credit for teachers who buy school supplies out-of-pocket.

References

External links
 
 McMath Woods P.A.
 Member Profile 86th General Assembly
 Member Profile 85th General Assembly
 Member Profile 84th General Assembly
 Member Profile 91st General Assembly

Living people
Arkansas lawyers
Arkansas Democrats
Pulaski County, Arkansas
Jacksonville High School (Arkansas) alumni
Vanderbilt University alumni
University of Arkansas alumni
1970 births
American United Methodists
21st-century American politicians